The 2019–20 Tulane Green Wave men's basketball team represents Tulane University during the 2019–20 NCAA Division I men's basketball season. The Green Wave, led by first-year head coach Ron Hunter, play their home games at Devlin Fieldhouse in New Orleans, Louisiana as sixth-year members of the American Athletic Conference.

Previous season 
The Green Wave 4–27, 0–18 in AAC play to finish in 12th place. They lost in the first round of the AAC tournament to Memphis.

On March 16, 2019, the school announced that Mike Dunleavy would not return as head coach. He finished 24–69 in three seasons at Tulane. On March 24, the school named Georgia State head coach Ron Hunter the new head coach.

Offseason

Departures

Incoming Transfers

2019 recruiting class

2020 recruiting class

Roster

Dec. 1, 2019 - Ray Ona Embo quit the team. He elected to return home to France to pursue a professional career.

Schedule and results

|-
!colspan=9 style=| Exhibition

|-
!colspan=9 style=| Non-conference regular season

|-
!colspan=9 style=| AAC regular season

|-
!colspan=9 style=| AAC tournament

Source
1.Cancelled due to the Coronavirus Pandemic

Awards and honors

American Athletic Conference honors

Player of the Week
Week 16: Teshaun Hightower

Source

References

Tulane Green Wave men's basketball seasons
Tulane
Tulane
Tulane